The Samudera Pasai Sultanate, also known as Samudera or Pasai or Samudera Darussalam or Pacem, was a Muslim harbour kingdom on the north coast of Sumatra from the 13th to the 16th centuries CE. The kingdom was believed to have been founded by Merah Silu, who later converted to Islam and adopted the name Malik ul Salih, in the year 1267 CE.

Little evidence has been left to allow for historical study of the kingdom.

Etymology 
Based on the local literature Hikayat Raja-raja Pasai, 'Samudera' can be inferred to have come from the word "Semudera", which meant 'a very large ant'. The name was given by Merah Silu when he discovered an ant as large as a cat while hunting at a 'high ground'. Eventually, the place was cleared for the establishment of a new state and 'Semudera' was adopted as its name.

'Samudera' is also theorised to have been derived from Samudra meaning ocean in Sanskrit and Tamil.

The literature also indicates the origin of the name 'Pasai' which came from Si-Pasai, the hunting dog of Sultan Malik al Salleh, who was Merah Silu after his conversion to Islam. The legend narrates that Sultan Malik al Salleh, while hunting with the dog, encountered a deer which was not afraid of the dog's barking but instead barked back. He was bewildered by this and thought that this might be a good sign for the place to be established as a new state for his son Sultan Malik Al Tahir. The dog died after the state was established. Sultan Malik al Salleh buried the dog there and he eventually named the place after it.

In the 14th century, the Italian traveller Odoric of Pordenone used the name Sumoltra for Samudra, and subsequent European writers also used similar forms of the name to refer to the Sumatra island itself.

History
Pasai exported its culture, and most importantly its language — an early form of Malay written in the Jawi alphabet — to a number of islands. Later, this language became the lingua franca among traders in what is now Indonesia and Malaysia.

Arab and Indian Muslims had traded in Indonesia and China for many centuries. A Muslim tombstone in eastern Java bears a date corresponding to 1082. But substantial evidence of Islam in Indonesia begins only in northern Sumatra at the end of the 13th century. Two small Muslim trading kingdoms existed by that time at Pasai and Peureulak or Perlak. A 1297 royal tomb at Samudra is inscribed entirely in Arabic. By the 15th century several harbour kingdoms developed, all ruled by local Muslim princes, from the north coast of Java and elsewhere to as far east as Ternate and Tidore in Maluku. Marco Polo spent five months here, he had Ferlec, Basma, and Samara (Samudera) mentioned in his travel story. Another famous traveller Ibn Battuta on his way to China stayed 15 days at Samudera. 

The establishment of the first Muslim centres in Indonesia was probably a result of commercial circumstances. By the 13th century the collapse of Srivijayan power, drew foreign traders to harbours on the northern Sumatran shores of the Bay of Bengal, safe from the pirate lairs at the southern end of the Strait of Malacca. Northern Sumatra had a hinterland rich in gold and forest produce, and pepper was being cultivated at the beginning of the 15th century. It was accessible to all the merchants of the archipelago who wanted to meet ships from the Indian Ocean.

In the year 1345, Ibn Battuta, a Moroccan traveller visited Samudra Pasai where he notes in his travel log that the ruler of Samudera Pasai was a pious Muslim, who performed his religious duties in utmost zeal. The madh'hab he observed was Imam Al-Shafi‘i. At that time Samudera Pasai was the end of Dar al-Islam for no territory east of this was ruled by a Muslim ruler. He praised the kindness and hospitality demonstrated by the sultan of Samudera Pasai. Here he stayed for about two weeks in the wooden walled town as a guest of the sultan, and then the sultan provided him with supplies and sent him on his way on one of sultan's own junks to China.

The Hongwu Emperor of China's Ming Dynasty listed Samudera in his admonition the Huang-Ming Zuxun as one of 14 countries which the Ming should not launch a military campaign against. By the end of the 14th century, Samudra-Pasai had become a wealthy commercial centre, giving way in the early 15th century to the better protected harbour of Malacca on the south-west coast of the Malay Peninsula. Majapahit attacked and looted the place in the middle of the 14th century.

Pasai's economic and political power depended almost entirely on foreigners. Muslim traders and teachers probably participated in its administration from the beginning and were bound to introduce religious practices that made them feel at home. The first Muslim beachheads in Indonesia, especially Pasai, were to a considerable extent genuine Muslim creations that commanded the loyalty of the local population and encouraged scholarly activities. Similar new harbour kingdoms  formed on the northern coast of Java. Tomé Pires, author of the Suma Oriental, writing not long after 1511, stresses the obscure ethnic origins of the founders of Cirebon, Demak, Japara, and Gresik. These Javanese coastal states served commerce with India and China and especially with Malacca, an importer of Javanese rice. The rulers of Malacca, despite their prestigious Srivijayan origin, accepted Islam precisely to attract Muslim and Javanese traders to their port.

The Portuguese occupied Pasai in 1521, 10 years after their conquest of Malacca. Through the Portuguese, the place become known in Europe as Pacem. Later, the Acehnese took control of Pasai.

List of rulers
These are the list of rulers who ruled the Samudera Pasai Sultanate:-

Historical heritage
The discovery of the tomb of Sultan Malik as-Saleh (696 H or 1267 AD), was referred to by historians as a sign that Islam had entered the Archipelago around the 13th century.  Although there is an opinion that the possibility of Islam has come earlier than that.  The story of the Pasai Kings is indeed full of myths and legends but the description of the story has helped in uncovering the dark side of history of the existence of this kingdom. The kingdom's past glory has inspired its people to re-use the name of the founder of this kingdom for the University of Malikussaleh in Lhokseumawe.

See also
 Malikussaleh
 List of Sunni Muslim dynasties

References

Further reading
 
 
 

History of Sumatra
Precolonial states of Indonesia
Former sultanates
History of Islam in Indonesia
Islamic states in Indonesia